Siyar Doldur (born 29 January 2000) is a Swiss professional footballer who plays as a midfielder for Bellinzona on loan from Sion.

Career
Doldur joined FC Sion in 2017, and his began his senior career with successive loans to Bellinzona and Chiasso. He made his professional debut with Sion in a 4–2 Swiss Super League loss to FC Basel 1893 on 9 December 2020.

On 27 August 2022, Doldur returned to Bellinzona on a new loan.

Personal life
Born in Switzerland, Doldur is of Turkish descent.

References

External links
 
 SFL Profile

2000 births
People from Bellinzona
Sportspeople from Ticino
Swiss people of Turkish descent
Living people
Swiss men's footballers
Association football midfielders
Switzerland youth international footballers
AC Bellinzona players
FC Chiasso players
FC Sion players
Swiss Promotion League players
Swiss Challenge League players
Swiss Super League players